Excel Central School is a co-educational English Medium School which is situated 1km west to Thiruvattar in Kanyakumari district of Tamil Nadu. It follows the Council for the Indian School Certificate Examinations, CISCE board, and is branded along with Excel Global School as the Excel Group of Schools. The school is one of the most popular and leading centres of education within the district and provides a broad and balanced modern curriculum. The Administration of the school is vested with the Centre for Educare and Research Charitable Trust, which is a non-profit organisation for rural education, led by Dr. Sree Kumar.

The school has entered into a joint venture with New Delhi based ISO 9001 certified Pearls International School, with a view to integrate new techniques and educational technology with existing educational standards.

Campus 
This institution was established in the academic year 2003–04. It is located 1.5km south-east of Moovattumugam, the converging point of River Kothai and River Pahrali. It is connected with a sub-road of Awai Farm-lane road from the link road of Kulasekaram – Marthandam at Thiruvattar from the main NH 47 in a serene, evergreen highland. It is 5 km from the Marthandam Railway Station and 50 km away from Thiruvananthapuram International Airport .

Library 
The library, also called by Excelites the Wisdom Centre within the campus, encompasses more than 3000 volumes of selected books on various subjects. It possesses reference materials and sources such as encyclopaedias, childcraft, dictionaries, domestic and international children's research documents, newspapers, and a collection of child play-related materials, i.e. Audio & Video Compact Disc and Tapes. Furthermore, it receives valuable advice from national and international research institutions and universities.

Space Observatory 
In 2015, a space observatory was inaugurated by NASA Astronaut Dr. Donald Alan Thomas in the campus to engage students with astronomy and astrophysics, while building a strong interest of space exploration within them. The space observatory currently houses a telescope used by students, teachers and parents to observe and research cosmic entities. Students have conducted research on Sunspots, the Moon and other nearby planets.

Resource Room 
The school also has an advanced research room with adequate computers with internet access, that is accessible to the students and teachers alike for academic and knowledgable purposes.

Administration

Governance 
The current principal of the school is Mr. Binu Kumar, acting under the supervision of the board of directors of Excel Group of Schools. Various vice principals and academic coordinators work in a close circle in accordance to the school's functioning guidelines.

Working time 
The school office is open between the hours of 9.00 A.M. and 5.30 P.M. Parents can meet the principal at any time during office hours. The office remains closed on Sundays and other Public Holidays. Regular school hours are from 0900 to 1600 hours, until grade nine and 0700 to 2000 hours for other grades. Every year has four respective terms of three months each, beginning with June and ending with May.

Student life

Clubs and After-school Activities 
The school has over ten different clubs associated with different themes for students to be a part of, led by senior teachers of the school. Student Council does not play an active but a passive role in assisting the teachers with their disciplinary workload. Various student organisations like Red Cross, Bharat Scouts and Guides and National Service Scheme also have presence within the school of which hundreds of students are active members.

Elite student led organisations of particular batches have existed within the campus like 'Make India Better', 'ISC Media cum Foundation' for the sake of charity and public awareness.

Student Media 
Students have played an active role in marketing and promoting events of the school along with the institution itself on various platforms like Youtube, Instagram and Facebook. This has given rise to various YouTubers focusing on the school at large, with a strong and growing base of followers. Many events at the school are shot by and edited by the students themselves.

Sport and Music 
The school has its own choir made of students from various batches that performs at various events during Onam and Christmas. Other facilities include an integrated multimedia music room, dance halls, a music hall, tennis courts, a 6 lane swimming pool and a 200-meter athletics track.

Other facilities 
All of the 71 classrooms are equipped with a range of interactive learning technologies, including touch screens and Smart-boards and multimedia projectors. It is the first school in Southern India to have introduced a Robotics Lab in 2015. The school operates a transport facility for the day scholars. Operating 55 Buses on different routes, the current operational limit of this service is 30 km from the school campus. A nursing station is maintained within the campus with trained staff to attend to any minor health problems of the children.

Awards and recognition

National 
IIMUN Kanyakumari 2016 Best School Award: Awarded by IIMUN at Kanyakumari for winning the most number of medals in 2016.

IIMUN Vellore 2016 Best School Award: Awarded by IIMUN at Vellore for winning the most number of medals in the year 2016.

NIF IGNITE Award: Awarded by National Innovation Foundation to Ram Nikash by the then President of India Dr. A. P. J. Abdul Kalam in the year 2014.

Notable People 

Primary schools in Tamil Nadu
High schools and secondary schools in Tamil Nadu
Schools in Kanyakumari district
Thiruvattar
Educational institutions established in 2003
2003 establishments in Tamil Nadu